The first world record in the men's javelin throw was recognised by the International Association of Athletics Federations in 1912.

As of 21 June 2009, 46 world records have been ratified by the IAAF in the event. New specifications for the javelin were introduced in 1986, and javelins with serrated tails were banned in 1991 which had the effect of reverting to an earlier record set in 1990.

Record progression

New specifications were introduced in 1986.

* achieved using Németh model (serrated tail)

Javelins with serrated tails were outlawed by the IAAF in Tokyo in August 1991 at the IAAF-Congress; several of the above records were rescinded as from 20 September 1991, and the record reverted to Steve Backley's 89.58, the longest throw with the regular new implement (as of 1986).

References

Javelin throw men
Javelin throw
Javelin 
World record javelin throw